The Stranger from Elster Street (German: Die Fremde aus der Elstergasse) is a 1921 German silent drama film directed by Alfred Tostary and starring Margit Barnay, Olaf Storm and Eduard von Winterstein. It premiered in Berlin on 7 June 1921.

Cast
 Margit Barnay  
 Olaf Storm  
 Eduard von Winterstein  
 Maria Forescu   
 Ilka Grüning   
 Frida Richard   
 Wilhelm Diegelmann   
 Georg John   
 Hermann Picha   
 Josefine Dora   
 Emil Mamelok   
 Harry Gondi   
 Berta Christians-Klein

References

Bibliography
 Grange, William. Cultural Chronicle of the Weimar Republic. Scarecrow Press, 2008.

External links

1921 films
Films of the Weimar Republic
German silent feature films
German drama films
Films directed by Alfred Tostary
1921 drama films
German black-and-white films
Silent drama films
1920s German films
1920s German-language films